LocoArts was an Argentine website created by Alejandro Szykula that hosts animated series such as “Alejo y Valentina” and others. Alejandro Szykula is also the scriptwriter, drawer, animator and voice provider of these animated series. These animation are made using Macromedia Flash and are based on an absurd humor. Its animation “Alejo y Valentina” is now broadcast on MTV Latin America.

Animations

Alejo y Valentina
Alejo y Valentina is an animated series, created by Alejandro Szykula made with Macromedia Flash, and broadcast on MTV Latin-American.

Timotines
Timotines is a tribute to South Park. It is about a group of children who have a very special Christmas holiday vacation. This series has only one episode, and was Alejandro's first animation to be uploaded.

Reynaldo
"Reynaldo" follows the adventures of a hitman who is forced to kill people by an evil teddy bear. The bear speaks English and uses profanities. The phrases are translated to Spanish by captions that remove the curses to produce a comical effect.

International broadcast
The animation "Alejo y Valentina" is also broadcast throughout the world:

 South America: MTV Latin America
 United States: MTV (Dubbed)
 Spain: MTV Spain.
 Israel: MTV Israel (dubbed)
 China: MTV China (dubbed)
 Japan: WOWOW (dubbed)
 U.K.: Channel 4 (dubbed)
 Germany: RTL II (dubbed)
 Italy: Fox Italy (dubbed)
 Europe: MTV Europe (dubbed in French and Danish)
 Brazil: MTV Brasil (dubbed)
 Mexico: MTV North.

External links 
LoCoArts web site
Article from the newspaper La Nación
Article from the newspaper Clarín

Television production companies of Argentina